= Yrjö Pärnänen =

Finnish footballer (1931-2009)

Personal information
- Date of birth: 5 January 1931
- Date of death: 1 November 2009 (aged 78)

International career
Years	Team	Apps	(Gls)
1961–1963	Finland	4	(0)

Yrjö Pärnänen (5 January 1931 – 1 November 2009) was a Finnish footballer. He played in four matches for the Finland national football team from 1961 to 1963.
